Simutek Package One is a compilation of video games for the TRS-80 developed by Simutek of Tucson, Arizona and published by Adventure International.

Contents
Simutek Package One is a software package consisting of 5 games in space: Graphic-Trek 2000, Star Wars, Space Target, Invasion Worg, and Saucers. The manual credits Graphic-Trek 2000 to Michael A. Gariepy.

Reception
Glenn Mai reviewed Simutek Package One in The Space Gamer No. 36, commenting that "This package is not worth [the price]." R.J. Stehr of Micro-80 concluded that "if you are after a space program package to add to your library, then this one would be very heard to beat and worthy of serious consideration."

Reviews
Getting to Know Personal Computers

References

1979 video games
TRS-80 games
TRS-80-only games
Video game compilations
Video games developed in the United States